Goes is a city and municipality in the southwestern Netherlands on Zuid-Beveland, in the province of Zeeland. The city of Goes has approximately 27,000 residents.

History

Goes was founded in the 10th century on the edge of a creek:  (the Short Gos). The village grew fast, and in the early 12th century it had a market square and a church devoted to Mary Magdalene. By 1300 it had a brick castle, now known as Oostende Castle.

In 1405 Goes received city rights from William II, Duke of Bavaria, by his right as count of Holland, and in 1417 it was allowed to build town walls. The prosperity of the city was based upon the cloth industry and the production of salt. In the 16th century, Goes declined. Its connection to the sea silted up and in 1554 a large fire destroyed part of the city.

In the autumn of 1572, during the course of the Eighty Years' War, Goes, in the Spanish Netherlands, was besieged by Dutch forces with the support of English troops. The siege was relieved in October 1572 by Spanish tercios, who waded across the Scheldt to attack the besieging forces. In 1577 the Spanish soldiers who occupied Goes were driven out by Prince Maurice of Nassau. The prince built a defence wall around Goes, which is still partly standing. From the 17th century, Goes did not play an important role, except as an agricultural centre. In 1868 a railway was constructed through it, but this did not lead to industrialisation. Agriculture remains the most important economic activity.

Although the Netherlands were neutral in the First World War, seven bombs hit Goes and Kloetinge, due to an error by a British airplane. A house in Magdalenastreet in Goes was destroyed and one person killed. Goes did not suffer extensive damage during the Second World War, but was under German occupation until 1944.

Goes did not experience much population growth until the 1970s and 1980s. Then, the city grew fast because of new districts like Goese Meer, Oostmolenpark, Overzuid and Ouverture being constructed. Goes is now the fourth largest economic centre in Zeeland. New districts are in preparation, amongst them Goese Schans, Mannee and Aria, where 3,000 new houses are to be built.

Population centers

Topography

Dutch Topographic map of Goes (town), Sept. 2014.

Districts

International relations

Twin towns — sister cities

Goes was twinned with Panevėžys, Lithuania.

On 22 July 2021 the town council decided to end the twinning.

Transport
Goes has a railway station located on the Roosendaal–Vlissingen railway.

Notable people

Public thinking & service 
 Cornelis Caesar (–1657), merchant and governor of Formosa
 C. H. D. Buys Ballot (1817–1890), chemist and meteorologist, invented Buys Ballot's law
 Isaäc Dignus Fransen van de Putte (1822–1902), politician
 Jacob Adriaan de Wilde (1879–1956), politician and jurist
 Leendert Ginjaar (1928–2003), politician and chemist
 Bas van Fraassen (born 1941), philosopher
 Albert J. R. Heck (born 1964), scientist and academic
 Katinka Simonse (born 1979) known as Tinkebell, artist

The arts 

 Willem Eversdijck (–1671), Golden Age painter
 Pieter Peutemans (1641–1698), Golden Age painter
 Pieter Adriaan Jacobus Moojen (1879- 1955), architect, painter and writer
 Leo van Doeselaar (born 1954), classical organist and conductor
 Adriaan Luteijn (born 1964), choreographer
 Boudewijn Vincent Bonebakker (born 1968) and Frank Harthoorn, guitarists of Gorefest

Sports 
 Myrna Veenstra (born 1975), former field hockey player, bronze medallist at the 2000 Summer Olympics
 Martijn Dieleman (born 1979), former Dutch volleyball player, competed at the 2000 Summer Olympics
 Lesley Pattinama Kerkhove (born 1991), tennis player

Gallery

References

External links

Official website 

 
Municipalities of Zeeland
Populated places in Zeeland
Zuid-Beveland